Thorold Merrett (born 30 September 1933) is a former Australian rules footballer, who played in the Victorian Football League (VFL).

Footballer 
From the Victorian country town Cobden, Merrett was a small footballer who was a keen Richmond fan who wanted to play league football for the Tigers.

At 16 years of age, Merrett was rejected by Richmond legend Jack Dyer because of his light frame, but he was given another opportunity at Victoria Park, where he stood out in a set of practice games for Collingwood just before the 1950 season. It was initially thought by followers and players that he would be 'killed' because of his size (168 cm, 59 kg).

He made his debut for Collingwood in 1950. At the age of 16 he was one of the youngest players in the VFL. Merrett played as a wingman and won respect for the accuracy and speed of his stab kick (which he had mastered on his farm as a kid by kicking stab passes through a suspended tyre). He became one of the best players in the competition despite his unusually small stature for a league footballer. In 1952, Merrett came equal sixth in the Brownlow Medal, and won a top three finish in the Copeland Trophy. A year later he again finished in the top 10 in the Brownlow Medal and celebrated the 1953 premiership with the Magpies, when he was one of the best players in the Grand Final.

In years that followed, Merrett performed consistently and he continued to be regarded as one of the best kicks in the league, as well as one of the best wingmen. He played in two losing Grand Finals in 1955 and 1956 (he had also played in the 1952 losing side). In 1958, Merrett changed roles to become a rover, and it succeeded. He won the club Best and Fairest and the Pies also won the 1958 flag, with Merrett named best on ground. In 1959, he again starred as a rover, winning a second consecutive Copeland Trophy, and finishing in the top 10 in the Brownlow Medal for a third time (he ended up with 77 career Brownlow votes).

Retirement 
A second broken leg in 1960 saw Merrett miss most of the season and, due to doubts about the strength of his leg (the bone had not knitted perfectly), aged 26, he retired, feeling his best football was past. He played 180 games in 11 seasons and kicked 148 goals. He was also a dual Best and Fairest and premiership player, and Victorian representative on seven occasions.

He was a regular panelist on the ABC's Football Round-up, which he and other panelists discussed the Saturday round of VFL football.

In 1997 he was included in the Collingwood Football Club Hall of Fame and Team of the Century, on the wing.

Business
Merrett formed a partnership with former Australian cricket captain Lindsay Hassett. The Merrett-Hassett sports stores had branches throughout Victoria. With the death of Hassett, Merrett went on to expand the stores. He later worked for Rebel Sport, a sporting goods store that later listed on the Australian Stock Exchange. In 2011 the business was taken over by the Super Retail Group.

Family
Current  players Jackson and Zach Merrett are Thorold's great nephews.

Footnotes

References 
  Hanlon, P., "The Last Men Standing" The Age, Wednesday, 20 March 2013

External links 

 
 Boyle's Football Photos: Thorold Merrett

Australian rules footballers from Victoria (Australia)
Collingwood Football Club players
Collingwood Football Club Premiership players
Cobden Football Club players
Copeland Trophy winners
Australian television personalities
1933 births
Living people
Two-time VFL/AFL Premiership players